Senza sapere niente di lei (internationally released as Unknown Woman) is a 1969 Italian giallo film produced and directed by Luigi Comencini. It is based on the novel La morale privata by Antonio Leonviola. For this film Paola Pitagora was awarded with a Silver Ribbon for best actress.

Cast
 Philippe Leroy: Nanni Brà
 Paola Pitagora: Cinzia
 Sara Franchetti: Pia
 Graziella Galvani: Giovanna
 Silvano Tranquilli: Zeppegno
 Umberto D'Orsi: Dante

References

External links
 

1969 films
Films directed by Luigi Comencini
Giallo films
1960s mystery films
Films scored by Ennio Morricone
Films with screenplays by Suso Cecchi d'Amico
1960s crime thriller films
1960s Italian-language films
1960s Italian films